Carlo Alberto D'Albertis (26 July 1906 – 17 April 1983) was a sailor from Italy, who represented his country at the 1928 Summer Olympics in Amsterdam, Netherlands.

Sources

 

Italian male sailors (sport)
Sailors at the 1928 Summer Olympics – 8 Metre
Olympic sailors of Italy
1906 births
1983 deaths